Coprinellus xanthothrix is a species of fungus in the family Psathyrellaceae. This species was isolated from a polyphenol-polluted site near an olive processing plant in Greece. Shown to have the enzymes laccase and manganese peroxidase, the fungus is able to decolorize the recalcitrant polymeric dye R-478. First described as Coprinus xanthothrix by the French mycologist Henri Romagnesi in 1941, it was later transferred to the genus Coprinellus in 2001.

References

xanthothrix
Fungi described in 1941